Rush Township is one of twelve townships in Buchanan County, Missouri, USA.  As of the 2010 census, its population was 892.

Rush Township was established in the 1840s.

Geography
It contains four cemeteries: Armstrong, Gore, Hudspeth and Sugar Creek.

Lewis and Clark Lake and Mud Lake are within this township. The streams of Goose Creek, Horseshoe Slough, Little Sugar Creek and Lost Creek run through this township.

Transportation
Rush Township contains one airport or landing strip, East Atchison Airport (historical).

References

External links
 US-Counties.com
 City-Data.com
 USGS Geographic Names Information System (GNIS)

Townships in Buchanan County, Missouri
Townships in Missouri